Ashburton District is a territorial authority district in the Canterbury Region of the South Island of New Zealand. It encompasses the town of Ashburton, a number of small towns and settlements and the surrounding rural area, roughly coterminous with Mid Canterbury.

Geography
Ashburton District extends from the Pacific Ocean to the Southern Alps, and from the Rangitata River to the Rakaia River, including the towns of Methven, Mount Somers, and Rakaia. The Hakatere Conservation Park covers a large area of the lower mountains, including Mount Hutt skifield, popular tramping area Mount Somers / Te Kiekie and the Ashburton Lakes.

Demographics

Ashburton District had a population of 33,423 at the 2018 New Zealand census, an increase of 2,382 people (7.7%) since the 2013 census, and an increase of 6,051 people (22.1%) since the 2006 census. There were 12,996 households. There were 17,016 males and 16,407 females, giving a sex ratio of 1.04 males per female. The median age was 39.1 years (compared with 37.4 years nationally), with 6,810 people (20.4%) aged under 15 years, 5,937 (17.8%) aged 15 to 29, 14,697 (44.0%) aged 30 to 64, and 5,982 (17.9%) aged 65 or older.

Ethnicities were 83.8% European/Pākehā, 8.2% Māori, 5.1% Pacific peoples, 7.4% Asian, and 2.3% other ethnicities. People may identify with more than one ethnicity.

The percentage of people born overseas was 18.6, compared with 27.1% nationally.

Although some people objected to giving their religion, 44.7% had no religion, 45.4% were Christian, 0.8% were Hindu, 0.2% were Muslim, 0.4% were Buddhist and 1.8% had other religions.

Of those at least 15 years old, 3,477 (13.1%) people had a bachelor or higher degree, and 6,243 (23.5%) people had no formal qualifications. The median income was $35,900, compared with $31,800 nationally. 4,071 people (15.3%) earned over $70,000 compared to 17.2% nationally. The employment status of those at least 15 was that 14,211 (53.4%) people were employed full-time, 4,281 (16.1%) were part-time, and 633 (2.4%) were unemployed.

Government
Ashburton District Council administers the district. The council consists of a mayor and nine councillors. The councillors are elected from three wards: five from the Ashburton ward, and two each from the Eastern and Western wards.

References

External links 

 
Districts of New Zealand